Lorna Lucas was an international lawn bowls competitor for Australia.

Bowls career

World Championships
Lucas won the pairs gold medal with Dot Jenkinson and the fours bronze medal with Joan Vaughan, Olive Rowe and Jenkinson, at the 1973 World Outdoor Bowls Championship in Wellington.

Four years later she won two gold medals and one silver medal at the 1977 World Outdoor Bowls Championship in Worthing. The two gold's were in the fours with Connie Hicks, Jenkinson and Merle Richardson and the team event (Taylor Trophy). The silver was in the pairs with Jenkinson.

National
She won 23 Avenue Bowls Club titles.

References

Year of birth missing
Year of death missing
Australian female bowls players
Bowls World Champions
Bacchus Marsh
20th-century Australian women